Heart Lake, Michigan is located in Otsego County in northern Michigan, about  south of Gaylord, just west of Interstate 75.

Heart Lake is so named due to its irregular shape of a valentine heart.

The lake is a classic example of a kettle lake, many of which dot the landscape in this area. The lake holds healthy populations of splake, rainbow trout, bass, northern pike, and perch, and is popular with area fishermen. While surrounded mostly by private residences, there is one public access point along East Heart Lake Road, which is maintained by the nearby Otsego Lake State Park.

See also
List of lakes in Michigan

External links

References

Lakes of Michigan
Bodies of water of Otsego County, Michigan